Waldburg is a town in the district of Ravensburg in Baden-Württemberg in Germany.

Waldburg may also refer to:

 House of Waldburg, a princely family of Upper Swabia
 Waldburg Castle, the ancestral castle of House of Waldburg in the district of Ravensburg, Germany
 Waldburg, Austria, a municipality in the district of Freistadt in the Austrian state of Upper Austria

See also
 Waldberg (disambiguation)
 Wildberg (disambiguation)
 Wildburg (disambiguation)
 Wildenburg (disambiguation)